Dime or Dima is an Afro-Asiatic language spoken in the northern part of the Selamago district in the Southern Nations, Nationalities and Peoples Region of Ethiopia, around Mount Smith. Dime divides into at least two dialects, which include Us'a and Gerfa. It has six case suffixes in addition to an unmarked nominative. It is overwhelmingly suffixing, but uses prefixes for demonstratives and reduplication.  Phonologically, it is noteworthy among the Omotic languages for having velar and uvular fricative phonemes.  The basic word order is SOV (subject–object–verb), as in other Omotic languages, indeed as in all the languages of the core of the Ethiopian Language Area.

The language, as well as the Dime people themselves, reportedly decreased in numbers over the 20th century due to predation from their neighbors the Bodi, and both are in danger of extinction. According to Ethiopian census figures, the 1994 census reported 6293 speakers of the Dime language in the Southern Nations, Nationalities and Peoples' Region alone; in the 2007 census, only 574 speakers were reported for all of Ethiopia.  Further, because the Dime language still lacks a writing system and there are no local schools to promote the use of the language, it is even more threatened.

References

External links
 Yilma, Aklilu and Ralph Siebert (2002), "Sociolinguistic survey report of the Chara, Dime, Melo and Nayi languages of Ethiopia part 1." SIL Electronic Survey Reports 2002-029.
 Ralph Siebert (2002), "Sociolinguistic survey report on the Dime language of Ethiopia." SIL Electronic Survey Reports 2002-043
 World Atlas of Language Structures information on Dime

Languages of Ethiopia
Aroid languages